Roberto de Oliveira Campos Neto (born 28 June 1969) is a Brazilian economist, former executive of Banco Santander, and current president of Central Bank of Brazil. He is the grandson of Brazilian politician Roberto Campos, who was minister of planning during the Brazilian military dictatorship. "Neto" is not his surname, but a suffix that means grandson in Portuguese, and is used for those with the same name as their grandfather.  

On 15 November 2018 Campos Neto was announced as the future President of the Central Bank of Brazil in the administration of Jair Bolsonaro. As a Central Banker, Campos Neto was featured in the Pandora Papers, a journalistic leak that exposed secret offshore accounts and he faced calls to resign.

Early life and education
Campos Neto was born in 1969. His grandfather Roberto de Oliveira Campos was a planning minister in the tenure of President Castelo Branco, and previously helped to create the Brazilian Development Bank.

Campos Neto studied economics and finance at UCLA, from which he received a bachelor's degree. He holds two master's degrees, one in economics from UCLA and another in applied mathematics from Caltech.

Career
From 1996 to 1999, Campos Neto worked at Banco Bozano Simonsen, and from 2000 to 2003, he headed Santander Brasil's department of international fixed income. In 2006 he was named the trading head of Santander, and in 2010 became the chief of treasury and regional and international markets of the bank. Campos Neto is a close acquaintance of Paulo Guedes, the Economy minister. On 26 February 2019, Campos Neto's appointment was approved by both Committee of Economic Affairs and the Federal Senate floor, with voting of 26–0 and 55–6, respectively.

In January 2021, Campos Neto was elected as the "Central Bank President of the Year" by the British magazine The Banker. That same year, Campos Neto was featured in the Pandora Papers, a journalistic leak that exposed the secret offshore accounts of people all over the world.

Other activities
 International Monetary Fund (IMF), Ex-Officio Alternate Member of the Board of Governors (since 2019)
 World Bank, Ex-Officio Alternate Member of the Board of Governors (since 2019)

References

Presidents of the Central Bank of Brazil
Brazilian economists
1969 births
Living people
People named in the Pandora Papers
University of California, Los Angeles alumni
California Institute of Technology alumni